Ragazzo (Italian for ) is a 1934 Italian lost film directed by Ivo Perilli. The film was censored by the Italian government, and its only known copy was subsequently looted by German soldiers in 1944 and has not resurfaced.

Plot 

The film follows Giovanni, a working-class orphan living in Rome, who realizes that his criminal lifestyle is wrong and becomes a devout fascist.

Cast 

The following is the cast of Ragazzo:

Costantino Frasca as Giovanni
Isa Pola as Principessita
Giovanna Scotto as La madre del ragazzo
Osvaldo Valenti as Malvivente di borgata
Anna Vinci as Antonietta
Marcello Martire as Dirigente fascista
Aristide Garbini as Pugile
Arnaldo Baldaccini as Proprietario della fabbrica

Production 

The film was directed by Ivo Perilli and the screenplay was done by Perilli and Emilio Cecchi. Filming by Cines-Pittaluga occurred in the "poorer sections" of Rome and the intended distributor was Società Anonima Stefano Pittaluga (SASP).

Censorship and destruction 

Ragazzo was the only completed Italian film, out of approximately 700, not to be released due to government censorship between 1930 and 1944. The Italian censorship commission, as well as Benito Mussolini himself, objected to the film's portrayal of the poorer sections of Rome, which the government had claimed no longer existed, and that a "model fascist" could arise from a "criminal gang of hooligans". As such, the film was never released nor screened in any Italian theater.

References

Citations

Bibliography

External links 

 

1934 films
Italian black-and-white films
1930s Italian-language films
Lost Italian films
1934 lost films